Ötemish Hajji (Ötemiş Hacı, fl. 1550) was a historian of Khwarezm, author of  Tarikh-i Dost Sultan (named for Dost Sultan, son of Bujugha khan, who briefly ruled the  Khanate of Khiva in 1557-1558, apparently the patron of the work), a narrative account of the history of the Ulus of Jochi, including the conversion of Uzbeg Khan, leader of the Golden Horde, to Islam in the early 14th century.

The work survives only in a single complete manuscript, formerly owned by Turkologist and Bashkir nationalist Zeki Velidi Togan (d. 1970). It has not been edited, and scholarly discussion is limited to Togan's own publications, and  publications such scholars as have consulted the manuscript in Togan's library.

References
Uli Schamiloglu,  The Umdet ul-ahbar and the Turkic Narrative Sources for the Golden Hordeand the Later Golden Horde in   H. B. Paksoy (ed.), Central Asian Monuments, 1992, .
Z. V. Togan, Turkistan Tarihi, Istanbul, 1947.

16th-century books
Iranian books